War sand is sand contaminated by remains of projectiles used in war. This kind of sand has been found in Normandy, since the invasion of Normandy, among other places. Researchers also discovered trace amounts of iron and glass beads in the sand, originating from the intense heat unleashed by munitions explosions in the air and sand.

Composition identification 
In 2013, Dr. Earle McBride, a researcher studying sandstone diagenesis and the textual and compositional maturation of sand during transportation, mixed samples collected from Omaha Beach in 1988 with a blue epoxy, creating an "artificial sandstone", before slicing it into thin sections. Utilising an optical microscope and an external light source, shiny, opaque grains could be identified. Although wave action had elicited rounding on the edges of some coarser grains, the shard-like angularity and corrosion of both coarse and fine grains suggested these grains were man-made. It is believed that the roughness of said grains was imparted by microporous surfaces produced during production and corrosion products post-explosion.

This inspection, alongside tests revealing that the grains were magnetic, led McBride to conclude these grains were pieces of shrapnel.

References

Pollution
Soil contamination
Sand
War
Ammunition